Down on Us is a low budget 1984 movie about a US government plot to assassinate 1960s rock stars Jim Morrison, Janis Joplin, and Jimi Hendrix, using an elite force of killers. It is sometimes known as Beyond the Doors.

The movie does not use any of the original songs of the artists portrayed due to high royalty fees.  Instead, they used songs written to sound like the originals.

Author F. Paul Wilson used a similar premise in his 1987 short story "The Years the Music Died."

Plot
The story of Jimi Hendrix, Jim Morrison, and Janis Joplin, and how their message for their generation made them targets of a US government plot.

Reception 
Variety's review was largely critical of the "campy" reproductions of concerts and other events. The review read, in part, "Pic's only revelation is the claim that Morrison faked his own death in order to regain his privacy".

A review in Austin American-Statesman called it, "the Reefer Madness of conspiracy theory movies".

A review in The Daily News read, "...the whole project is so out of it, it seems like the work of a Martian whose understanding of the counterculture comes entirely from reading old issues of Life magazine".

References

External links

Review of Down On Us aka Beyond The Doors at Manor on Movies

1984 films
1984 drama films
Films directed by Larry Buchanan
1980s English-language films